The Cumbria Cup is an annual rugby union knock-out club competition organized by the Cumbria Rugby Union.  It was first introduced during the 1882-83 season, when it was known as the Cumberland Challenge Cup, and the inaugural winners were Aspatria.  Originally it was open only to club sides in Cumberland, but in 1974, as a result of the 1972 Local Government Act, Cumberland, Westmorland and Furness merged to form what we now know as Cumbria, and the competition was renamed as the Cumbria Cup, although the Westmorland & Furness Cup continued intermittently up until 2008.  It is the most important cup competition in the county ahead of the Cumbria League Cup and Cumbria Shield.

The Cumbria Cup is currently open to the top club sides based in Cumbria, typically playing in tier 5 (National League 3 North), tier 6 (North 1 West) and tier 7 (North Lancashire/Cumbria), of the English rugby union league system.  The format is a knockout cup with a first round, quarter-finals, semi-finals and a final to be held at a neutral venue between April–May.  Between 2006-14 there was also a Cumbria Plate competition for sides knocked out of the first round of the main cup competition but this has been discontinued in recent years.

Winners

Cumbria Plate winners

Number of wins

Cup

Aspatria (32)
Wigton (13)
Workington (12)
Egremont (8)
Penrith (8)
Keswick (7)
Cockermouth (6)
Carlisle (5)
Kendal (5)
Whitehaven (4)
Millom (3)
Seaton (3)
Maryport (2)
Netherhall (2)
Silloth (2)
St Benedict's (2)
Blennerhasset (1)
St Bees (1)

Plate 
St Benedict's (2)
Keswick (1)
Millon (1)
Upper Eden (1)
Whitehaven (1)
Workington (1)

Notes

See also
 Cumbria Rugby Union
 Cumbria League Cup
 Cumbria Shield
 Westmorland & Furness Cup

References

External links
 Cumbria RU

Recurring sporting events established in 1882
1882 establishments in England
Rugby union cup competitions in England
Rugby union in Cumbria